Iraq participated in the 2018 Asian Games in Jakarta and Palembang, Indonesia from 18 August to 2 September 2018. Iraq first competed at the Asian Games in 1974 Tehran, and the best achievement was in 1982 Delhi, when the country was ranked 11th with a total 9 medals, 2 gold, 3 silver, and 4 bronze medals. At the last edition in Incheon, Iraq had collected 4 medals, and was ranked 25th in medals tally.

Medalists

The following Iraq competitors won medals at the Games.

|  style="text-align:left; width:78%; vertical-align:top;"|

|  style="text-align:left; width:22%; vertical-align:top;"|

Competitors 
The following is a list of the number of competitors representing Iraq that participated at the Games:

Archery

Compound

Athletics 

Iraq entered thirteen athletes (10 men's and 3 women's) to participate in the athletics competition at the Games.

Basketball 

Summary

3x3 basketball
Iraq national 3x3 team participated in the Games, the men's team placed in pool D based on the FIBA 3x3 federation ranking.

Men's tournament

Roster
The following is the Iraq roster in the men's 3x3 basketball tournament of the 2018 Asian Games.
Ihab Hasan Ibadi Al-Zuhairi
Abbas Hikmat Abdulimam Alqarnawi
Jasim Al-Saadi
Abdullah Majeed Abdullah

Pool D

Boxing 

Men

Canoeing

Sprint

Qualification legend: QF=Final; QS=Semifinal

Handball 

Iraq competed in the group D at the men's team event.

Summary

Men's tournament

Roster

Bilal Al-Sabbagh
Raed Al Baghdadi
Hussein Ibadi
Jasim Mohammed
Mintadher Ali
Ahmed Al Azzawi
Mohanad Al Behadili
Ali Al Akayshee
Majid Al-Akayshi
Mohammed Rashid
Karrar Al-Battat
Maytham Al Behadili
Mustafa Al Azzawi
Ali Abdlkan
Baderaldeen Naser
Mohammed Al Azzawi

Group D

Main round (Group I)

Seventh place game

Ju-jitsu 

Iraq entered the ju-jitsu competition with 2 men's athletes.

Men

Judo 

Iraq put up 3 athletes for Judo:

Men

Kurash 

Men

Rowing 

Men

Sambo

Weightlifting 

Safaa Rashed Al-Jumaili secured Iraq's first medal at the Games, by winning the gold in the 85 kg with a total 361 kg lifts.

Men

Women

References 

Nations at the 2018 Asian Games
2018
Asian Games